Nemagerd (also Romanized as Nemāgerd; also known as Namājerd and Nimagird) is a village in Varzaq-e Jonubi Rural District, in the Central District of Faridan County, Isfahan Province, Iran. At the 2006 census, its population was 838, in 198 families.

References 

Populated places in Faridan County